Capri is a municipality in the Metropolitan City of Naples situated on the island of Capri in Italy. It comprises the centre and east of the island, while the west belongs to Anacapri.

Main sights
Sights in the municipality include Via Krupp, Faraglioni, Arco Naturale, Villa Lysis, Villa Malaparte. The Palazzo a Mare are the most extensive Roman remains upon Capri's littoral zone.

 Marina Grande, port of Capri
 Piazza Umberto I, the Piazzetta
 Certosa di San Giacomo, with a view to the port Marina Piccola
 Villa Jovis

Churches
Chiesa di San Costanzo
Chiesa di Santo Stefano
Chiesa di Sant'Anna
Chiesa di S. Michele
Chiesa di S. Maria del soccorso
Chiesa di S. Andrea
Chiesa di Costantinopoli
Cimitero acattolico di Capri

Economy
The international luxury linen clothing brand 100% Capri opened its first boutique in Capri in 2000.

Transport
There are ferries and hydrofoil to the port of Capri from Naples' ports of Mergellina and Molo Beverello, Sorrento, Positano and Amalfi. From the port of Marina Grande, the Capri funicular climbs to Capri town above.

The nearest airport is Napoli-Capodichino Airport (NAP).

Gallery

References

External links

 
Coastal towns in Campania
Cities and towns in Campania